The infrastructure of the East Coast Main Line consists of the tunnels, viaducts and bridges on the East Coast Main Line as well as the line-side monitoring equipment. The line is mainly quadruple track from London to Stoke Tunnel, south of Grantham, with two double track sections: one between Digswell Jn & Woolmer Green Jn, where the line passes over the Digswell Viaduct, Welwyn North station and the two Welwyn tunnels; and one between Fletton Junction (south of Peterborough) and Holme Junction, south of Holme Fen. The route between Holme Junction and Huntingdon is mostly triple track, with the exception of a southbound loop between Conington and Woodwalton. North of Grantham the line is double track except for quadruple-track sections at Retford, around Doncaster, between Colton Junction (south of York), Thirsk and Northallerton, and Newcastle.

With most of the line rated for  operation, the ECML was the fastest main line in the UK until the opening of High Speed 1. The high speeds are possible because much of the line is on fairly straight track on the flatter, eastern side of England, through Lincolnshire and Cambridgeshire, though there are significant speed restrictions because of the line's curvature particularly north of Darlington and between Doncaster and Leeds. Speeds on the West Coast Main Line (WCML) were increased with the introduction of tilting Pendolino trains and now match the 125 mph speeds on the ECML.

Tunnels, viaducts and bridges
Major civil engineering structures on the East Coast Main Line include

References

East Coast Main Line
Rail infrastructure
Viaducts in the United Kingdom